Dilip Manglu Borse is an Indian politician and a member of the 14th Maharashtra Legislative Assembly. He represents Baglan (Vidhan Sabha constituency) and he belongs to the Bharatiya Janata Party.

References

Maharashtra MLAs 2019–2024
Living people
Bharatiya Janata Party politicians from Maharashtra
Year of birth missing (living people)